Hearts and Diamonds is a 1914 American silent short film directed by George D. Baker.

Cast 
 John Bunny - Widower Tupper
 Flora Finch - Miss Rachel Whipple
 Ethel Lloyd - Tupper's Daughter
 Ethel Corcoran - Tupper's Daughter
 Charles Eldridge - Toper Staggs - The Uncle
 William Shea - Uncle William

References

External links 

1914 drama films
1914 films
American silent short films
American black-and-white films
Silent American drama films
1910s English-language films
1910s American films